Bruno Gironcoli (27 September 1936 – 19 February 2010) was an Austrian modern artist. 

Born in Villach, Gironcoli began training as a goldsmith in 1951 in Innsbruck, completing his apprenticeship in 1956. Between 1957 and 1962 he studied in the University of Applied Arts Vienna. In 1977 Gironcoli became head of the School of Sculpture at the Academy of Fine Arts Vienna, as successor to Fritz Wotruba. He was the official Austrian representative at the 2003 Venice Biennale.

The most substantial collection of his work so far can be seen since September 2004 in a dedicated museum in the Park at Schloss Herberstein. In an area of 2000 square metres, many of his large futuristic sculptures are exhibited.

Bruno Gironcoli died in February 2010 in Wien after a long illness. He was interred at Wiener Zentralfriedhof.

Honours and awards
 Prize of the city of Vienna for Visual Arts (1976)
 Grand Austrian State Prize (1993)
 Austrian Decoration for Science and Art (1997)

External links 

 
Obituary in The Independent by Marcus Williamson
Gironcoli Museum
The Africa-Collection of Gironcoli (german)
Vita, exhibitions and works at Galerie Altnöder

References

1936 births
2010 deaths
People from Villach
Academic staff of the Academy of Fine Arts Vienna
Recipients of the Austrian Decoration for Science and Art
Recipients of the Grand Austrian State Prize
Austrian contemporary artists